The England–Scotland Professional Match was an annual men's professional golf competition between teams representing England and Scotland. It was played from 1903 to the start of World War I and was then revived in 1932 and played until the start of World War II. The match was played on a single day, generally a few days before the Open Championship. Except on one occasion, there were 12 players in each team who played 12 singles matches and 6 foursomes. Scotland won the inaugural match in 1903 but didn't win another match, although three matches were tied. The event was organised by the PGA and only members of the PGA were eligible to play.

History
In 1902 an international match between English and Scottish amateur golfers was played at Royal Liverpool Golf Club prior to the Amateur Championship there. The match consisted of 10 singles matches played over 36 holes. The following year the Professional Golfers' Association decided to organise a similar match for professionals at Prestwick, before the 1903 Open Championship. It was originally planned to play 36-hole singles but it was later decided to play both singles and foursomes. Because only members of the PGA were eligible to play, a number of Scottish golfers were not available for selection, including William Auchterlonie, Andrew Kirkaldy and Archie Simpson. Tom Williamson was originally selected for the England team but was replaced by Fred Collins.

The 1908 match was abandoned because of bad weather. The England team was: Tom Ball, George Cawsey, Phil Gaudin, Ernest Gray, Rowland Jones, Charles Mayo, Ted Ray, James Sherlock, J.H. Taylor, Harry Vardon, Tom Vardon, Tom Williamson. The Scottish team was: James Braid, George Duncan, James Hepburn, Sandy Herd, John Hunter, Andrew Kirkaldy, Ben Sayers, Ben Sayers, Jr., Ralph Smith, Tom Watt, Robert Thomson, Jack White.

In 1909 there was a dispute about which team Fred Robson would represent. He was born in Wales but apparently had a Scottish father and English mother and was initially selected for both sides. Having learnt his golf in England he eventually chose to represent that country. A meeting of the PGA on the following Monday accepted the principle that the player could choose in such situations. However this account is contradicted by evidence from the 1891 census of Wales which records that his father was born in Birmingham and mother in Holywell, Wales.

There was no match in 1911 because a "Coronation Match" had been organised between teams of amateurs and professionals on the Saturday before the Open Championship, 24 June. The match was in celebration of the coronation of George V on 22 June. The match consisted of 9 foursomes matches, each over 36 holes and resulted in an 8–1 win for the professionals.

The PGA decided that the 1914 match would not be played at the same time as the Open Championship. The proprietors of Country Life agreed to provide a cup. It was planned to play the 1914 match at Royal Mid-Surrey Golf Club on 22 October. Even after the outbreak of World War I it was decided to still hold the event and to raise money for the Prince of Wales' War Fund but the match was eventually cancelled. A charity match was played at Fulwell Golf Course on 12 December 1914 between English and Scottish members of the Southern section of the PGA in aid of Princess Mary's Christmas Gifts Fund for soldiers and sailors. The match followed the same format as the full international. The English players won by 8 matches to 6 with 4 matches halved.

England won all 7 matches played from 1932 to 1938. The closest match was in 1937 when Scotland led 4–0 after the foursomes but England won 9 of the 12 singles to win 9–7. England and Scotland played two matches in 1938 since they also met in the Llandudno International Golf Trophy in September. Henry Cotton was selected for the England team in 1932 but declined the invitation and was replaced by George Oke. Cotton never played in any of the matches.

The 1939 match was cancelled because of the expense and difficulty of collecting the entrance charges on the Old Course at St Andrews. The PGA has already received permission from the Town Council to charge for entry.

Format
Except in 1907 the teams had 12 players. There were 12 singles matches and 6 foursomes. Matches were over 18 holes. In the earlier period the singles were played in the morning and the foursomes in the afternoon but when the event was revived in 1932 the order was reversed. In 1907 there were 16 in each team who each played a 36-hole singles match. The result was decided by the number of matches won, halved matches were not included in the final score. In the matches before World War I the players went out in ranking order with the best  players going out first. The same principle was applied to the foursomes with the two best players on each team playing each other in the first foursomes. Generally the same players contested the singles and the foursomes. However, in 1932 Sandy Herd and Peter Robertson played in the foursomes but were replaced by the reserves, Jock Ballantine and Jimmy Adams in the singles. In 1933 Robertson again missed the singles and Jack McMillan played instead.

Results

Appearances
The following are those who played in at least one of the 16 matches. Laurie Ayton, Snr, George Duncan, Tom Fernie and Sandy Herd played for Scotland in both the earlier period (1903–1913) and the later matches (1932–1938). No Englishman played in both periods.

England

1903–1913
 Tom Ball 1909, 1910, 1912, 1913
 James Batley 1912
 George Cawsey 1906, 1907
 Fred Collins 1903, 1904
 Phil Gaudin 1905, 1906, 1907, 1909, 1912, 1913
 Ernest Gray 1904, 1905, 1907
 Rowland Jones 1903, 1904, 1905, 1906, 1907, 1909, 1910, 1912, 1913
 Charles Mayo 1907, 1909, 1910, 1912, 1913
 George Pulford 1904, 1907
 Peter Rainford 1903
 Ted Ray 1903, 1904, 1905, 1906, 1907, 1909, 1910, 1912, 1913
 Wilfrid Reid 1906, 1907, 1909, 1910, 1912, 1913
 Thomas Renouf 1903, 1904, 1905, 1910, 1912
 Fred Robson 1909, 1910
 Jack Rowe 1903, 1906, 1907
 James Sherlock 1903, 1904, 1905, 1906, 1907, 1909, 1910, 1912, 1913
 J.H. Taylor 1903, 1904, 1905, 1906, 1907, 1909, 1910, 1912, 1913
 Josh Taylor 1913
 Albert Tingey, Sr. 1903, 1905
 Alfred Toogood 1904, 1905, 1906, 1907
 Walter Toogood 1903, 1907
 Harry Vardon 1903, 1904, 1905, 1906, 1907, 1909, 1910, 1912, 1913
 Tom Vardon 1903, 1904, 1905, 1906, 1907, 1909, 1910
 Tom Williamson 1904, 1905, 1906, 1907, 1909, 1910, 1912, 1913
 Reg Wilson 1913

1932–1938
 Percy Alliss 1932, 1933, 1934, 1935, 1936, 1937
 Bill Branch 1936
 Sid Brews 1934
 Dick Burton 1935, 1936, 1937, 1938
 Harry Busson 1938
 Jack Busson 1934, 1935, 1936, 1937
 Tom Collinge 1937
 Archie Compston 1932, 1935
 Bill Cox 1935, 1936, 1937
 Don Curtis 1934, 1938
 Bill Davies 1932, 1933
 Cecil Denny 1936
 Syd Easterbrook 1932, 1933, 1934, 1935, 1938
 Bert Gadd 1933, 1935
 Tom Green 1935
 Arthur Havers 1932, 1933, 1934
 Ted Jarman 1935
 Bob Kenyon 1932
 Sam King 1934, 1936, 1937, 1938
 Arthur Lacey 1932, 1933, 1934, 1936, 1937, 1938
 Arthur Lees 1938
 Abe Mitchell 1932, 1933, 1934
 George Oke 1932, 1937
 Alf Padgham 1932, 1933, 1934, 1935, 1936, 1937, 1938
 Alf Perry 1933, 1936, 1938
 Mark Seymour 1932, 1933
 Jack Taylor 1937
 Charles Whitcombe 1932, 1933, 1934, 1935, 1936, 1937, 1938
 Eddie Whitcombe 1938
 Reg Whitcombe 1933, 1934, 1935, 1936, 1937, 1938

Scotland

1903–1913
 Laurie Ayton, Snr 1910, 1912, 1913
 James Braid 1903, 1904, 1905, 1906, 1907, 1909, 1910, 1912
 George Coburn 1903, 1904, 1905, 1907
 Frank Coltart 1909
 George Duncan 1906, 1907, 1909, 1910, 1912, 1913
 Tom Fernie 1910, 1912, 1913
 Willie Fernie 1903, 1904
 Allan Gow 1912
 Tom Grant 1913
 James Hepburn 1903, 1905, 1906, 1907, 1910, 1912, 1913
 Sandy Herd 1903, 1904, 1905, 1906, 1907, 1909, 1910, 1912, 1913
 Willie Hunter, Sr. 1906, 1907, 1909, 1910
 James Kay 1903
 James Kinnell 1903, 1904, 1905, 1906, 1907, 1910, 1912
 Andrew Kirkaldy 1904, 1905, 1907, 1909, 1910
 Jack Kirkaldy 1905, 1906
 Peter McEwan Jr. 1907
 Alex Marling 1913
 Jack Park 1909
 Willie Park, Jr. 1903, 1904, 1905, 1907, 1910
 Willie Ritchie 1913
 Ben Sayers 1903, 1904, 1905, 1906, 1907, 1909, 1910, 1912, 1913
 Ben Sayers, Jr. 1906, 1907, 1909
 Archie Simpson 1904
 Ralph Smith 1903, 1904, 1907, 1909, 1913
 Robert Thomson 1903, 1904, 1905, 1906, 1907, 1909, 1910, 1912
 Tom Watt 1907
 Willie Watt 1912, 1913
 Jack White 1903, 1904, 1905, 1906, 1907, 1909, 1912, 1913
 Tom Yeoman 1905, 1906

1932–1938
 Jimmy Adams 1932, 1933, 1934, 1935, 1936, 1937, 1938
 Willam Anderson 1937
 Laurie Ayton, Jnr 1937
 Laurie Ayton, Snr 1933, 1934
 Jock Ballantine 1932, 1936
 Hamish Ballingall 1938
 Stewart Burns 1932
 Allan Dailey 1932, 1933, 1934, 1935, 1936, 1938
 William Davis 1937, 1938
 Tom Dobson 1932, 1933, 1934, 1935, 1936, 1937
 John Donaldson 1932, 1935, 1938
 George Duncan 1932, 1934, 1935, 1936, 1937
 Gordon Durward 1937
 Sydney Fairweather 1933, 1935, 1936
 John Fallon 1936, 1937, 1938
 Walter Fenton 1932
 Tom Fernie 1933
 Jim Forrester 1932, 1933, 1934, 1935, 1936
 Gordon Good 1934, 1936
 Tom Haliburton 1938
 Willie Hastings 1937, 1938
 Sandy Herd 1932
 George Hutton 1937, 1938
 George Knight 1937
 Bill Laidlaw 1935, 1936, 1938
 Duncan McCulloch 1932, 1933, 1934, 1935, 1936, 1937
 Jimmy McDowall 1932, 1933, 1934, 1935, 1936
 Gregor McIntosh 1938
 Jack McMillan 1933, 1934, 1935
 Willie McMinn 1932, 1933, 1934
 Fred Robertson 1938
 Peter Robertson 1932, 1933
 Willie Spark 1935
 Tom Wilson 1933, 1934

References

Team golf tournaments
Golf in Scotland
Golf in England
Recurring sporting events established in 1903
Recurring sporting events disestablished in 1939